Christopher David Futcher (born 1958) is a British Anglican priest who has been Archdeacon in Cyprus since his collation on 7 September 2019; he was previously Archdeacon of Exeter since 2012.

Biography

Futcher was educated at Strode's Grammar School, the University of Edinburgh, Heythrop College, University of London, King's College London and Westcott House, Cambridge.

He was ordained deacon in 1982, and priest in 1983. After a curacy in Borehamwood he was Vicar of All Saints, Pin Green, then St Stephen, St Albans, and then rector of St Nicholas Church, Harpenden before going to Exeter. In September 2019 Christopher was collated as Archdeacon in Cyprus and licensed as the parish priest of St Helena's Church Larnaca in the Diocese of Cyprus and the Gulf.

He is married to Anne, also a priest, and they have two adult children, James and Charlotte.

References

1958 births
Living people
People from Luton
People educated at Strode's Grammar School
Alumni of King's College London
Alumni of the University of Edinburgh
Alumni of Heythrop College
Archdeacons of Exeter
Archdeacons of Cyprus